FC Trelleborg is a Swedish football club located in Trelleborg in Skåne County.

Background
Stavsten/Ymor Fotbollklubb was founded in 2006 and played in Division 3 Södra Götaland. At the end of the 2008 season it was decided to change the name of the club from Stavsten/Ymor FK to FC Trelleborg.  This has been a most exciting initiative as the new name has strengthened the club's identity by providing a clearer connection with the city of Trelleborg.

Over the last couple of seasons youth development has continued to thrive which has been reflected by increased membership levels. However, training schedules have become increasingly hampered by the lack of a proper home venue and the club continues to conduct its operations across three locations, namely Ymorvallen, Vannhög and Söderslättshallen. Discussions are continuing to take place with the Recreation Committee of the Trelleborg Municipality to provide new investment to help resolve the issue.

Since their foundation FC Trelleborg has participated in the middle divisions of the Swedish football league system.  The club currently plays in Division 3 Södra Götaland which is the fifth tier of Swedish football. They play their home matches at the Ymorvallen in Trelleborg.

FC Trelleborg are affiliated to Skånes Fotbollförbund.  Local rivals IFK Trelleborg play in the same division.

Season to season

Attendances

In recent seasons FC Trelleborg have had the following average attendances:

Current squad

Footnotes

External links
 FC Trelleborg – Official website
 FC Trelleborg Facebook

Sport in Trelleborg
Football clubs in Skåne County
Association football clubs established in 2006
2006 establishments in Sweden